is a Japanese fashion model and former idol singer.

Career
She debuted as a member of the girl group Fairies in 2011.

Bibliography

Magazines
 Seventeen, as an exclusive model since 2013

Theater
 Little Women, as Amy March since 2019

References

External links
 Seventeen model profile 
  

Living people
1998 births
Fairies (Japanese group)
Singers from Tokyo
Japanese idols
Japanese female models
Japanese women singers
Japanese female dancers
Avex Group artists